The  was a political party in Japan that existed between 1948 and 1955.

History 
Following the defeat of the Japan Socialist Party (JSP) in 1948 at the hands of Japan's two main conservative parties, the Liberal Party and the Democrat Party, the Japan Socialist Party dissolved into chaos and internal bickering between moderate reformist socialists and more radical revolutionary socialists. The SDPJ split, with some of its members forming a more centrist social-democratic party, while others formed a more radical socialist party. Both groups claimed the name Nihon Shakaitō but different English translations, and are known as the Left Socialist Party of Japan and the Right Socialist Party of Japan, respectively.

The left-wing in Japan was in chaos between 1948 and 1955. In early 1955, the Left and Right Socialists reconciled and merged to reform the JSP, months before the Liberal Democrat Party was created through a merger of the Liberal and Democrat parties. The Left Socialists generally had the upper hand in the reunified JSP, causing a few former Right Socialists to leave the party in 1960 to create the Democratic Socialist Party.

Election results

House of Representatives

House of Councillors

See also 
 Itsurō Sakisaka
 List of political parties in Japan
 Politics of Japan

References 

Defunct political parties in Japan
Far-left political parties
Far-left politics in Japan
Marxist organizations
Political parties established in 1948
Political parties disestablished in 1955
Socialism in Japan
Socialist parties in Japan